The Sfax Governorate is one of the governorates of Tunisia. The governorate has a population of 955,421 (2014) and an area of 7,545 km². Its capital is Sfax. It is along the east coast of Tunisia, and includes the Kerkennah Islands.

Administrative divisions

The following sixteen municipalities are located in Sfax Governorate:

The largest airport in the region is the Sfax–Thyna International Airport.

The area code for telephoning to the Sfax governorate is 30.

References

 
Governorates of Tunisia